Santon may refer to:

 Davide Santon, Italian footballer
 Santon (Transformers), a fictional Beast Wars character
 Santon (figurine), a small figurine cast in terracotta or a similar material
 Santon, Lincolnshire, a small hamlet in North Lincolnshire, close to Scunthorpe
 Santon, Norfolk, a place in the English county of Norfolk
 Santon (parish), a village and a parish in the Isle of Man
 HMNZS Santon (M1178), a minesweeper of the Royal New Zealand Navy
 Santon Bridge, a small village in Copeland, Cumbria
 Santon Downham, a village in West Suffolk
 Thomas Santon

See also
 Wali, Muslim holy man or saint, sometimes called "santon" in English